Spilarctia moorei is a moth in the family Erebidae. It was described by Snellen in 1879. It is found on Sulawesi.

References

Moths described in 1879
moorei